Generative music is a term popularized by Brian Eno to describe music that is ever-different and changing, and that is created by a system.

Historical background 

In 1995 whilst working with SSEYO's Koan software (built by Tim Cole and Pete Cole who later evolved it to Noatikl then Wotja), Brian Eno used the term "generative music" to describe any music that is ever-different and changing, created by a system. The term has since gone on to be used to refer to a wide range of music, from entirely random music mixes created by multiple simultaneous CD playback, through to live rule-based computer composition.

Koan was SSEYO's first real-time music generation system, developed for the Windows platform. Work on Koan was started in 1990, and the software was first released to the public in 1994. In 1995 Brian Eno started working with SSEYO's Koan Pro software, work which led to the 1996 publication of his title 'Generative Music 1 with SSEYO Koan Software'.

Eno's early relationship with SSEYO Koan and Intermorphic co-founder Tim Cole was captured and published in his 1995 diary A Year with Swollen Appendices.

Theory 
There are four primary perspectives on generative music (Wooller, R. et al., 2005) (reproduced with permission):

Linguistic/structural
Music composed from analytic theories that are so explicit as to be able to generate structurally coherent material (Loy and Abbott 1985; Cope 1991).  This perspective has its roots in the generative grammars of language (Chomsky 1956) and music (Lerdahl and Jackendoff 1983), which generate material with a recursive tree structure.

Interactive/behavioural
Music generated by a system component that has no discernible musical inputs. That is, "not transformational" (Rowe 1991; Lippe 1997:34; Winkler 1998). The Wotja software by Intermorphic, and the Koan software by SSEYO used by Brian Eno to create Generative Music 1, are both examples of this approach.

Creative/procedural
Music generated by processes that are designed and/or initiated by the composer.  Steve Reich's It's Gonna Rain and Terry Riley's In C are examples of this (Eno 1996).

Biological/emergent
Non-deterministic music (Biles 2002), or music that cannot be repeated, for example, ordinary wind chimes (Dorin 2001).  This perspective comes from the broader generative art movement.  This revolves around the idea that music, or sounds may be "generated" by a musician "farming" parameters within an ecology, such that the ecology will perpetually produce different variation based on the parameters and algorithms used. An example of this technique is Joseph Nechvatal's Viral symphOny: a collaborative electronic noise music symphony created between the years 2006 and 2008 using custom artificial life software based on a viral model.

Other notes 
 Brian Eno, who coined the term generative music, has used generative techniques on many of his works, starting with Discreet Music (1975) up to and including (according to Sound on Sound Oct 2005) Another Day on Earth.  His works, lectures, and interviews on the subject have done much to promote generative music in the avant-garde music community. Eno used SSEYO's Koan generative music system (created by Pete Cole and Tim Cole of Intermorphic), to create his hybrid album Generative Music 1 (published by SSEYO and Opal Arts in April 1996), which is probably his first public use of the term generative music.
 Lerdahl and Jackendoff's publication described a generative grammar for homophonic tonal music, based partially on a Schenkerian model.  While originally intended for analysis, significant research into automation of this process in software is being carried out by Keiji Hirata and others.
 In It's Gonna Rain, an early work by contemporary composer Steve Reich, overlapping tape loops of the spoken phrase "it's gonna rain" are played at slightly different speeds, generating different patterns through phasing.
 A limited form of generative music was attempted successfully by members of the UK electronic music act Unit Delta Plus; Delia Derbyshire, Brian Hodgson and Peter Zinovieff, in 1968. However, its use would only be popularized later on.

See also 

 Generative art
 Aleatoric music
 Algorithmic composition
 Cellular automaton
 Change ringing
 Computer-generated music
 Interactive music
 Live coding
 List of music software
 Musikalisches Würfelspiel

Footnotes

References 
Artística de Valencia, After The Net, 5 – 29 June 2008, Valencia, Spain: catalogue: Observatori 2008: After The Future, p. 80
Biles, A. 2002a. GenJam in Transition: from Genetic Jammer to Generative Jammer. In International Conference on Generative Art, Milan, Italy.
Chomsky, N. 1956. Three models for the description of language. IRE Transcripts on Information Theory, 2: 113-124.
Collins, N. 2008. The analysis of generative music programs. Organised Sound, 13(3): 237–248.
Cope, D. 1991. Computers and musical style. Madison, Wis.: A-R Editions.
Dorin, A. 2001. Generative processes and the electronic arts. Organised Sound, 6 (1): 47-53.
Eno, B. 1996. Generative Music. http://www.inmotionmagazine.com/eno1.html (accessed 26 February 2009).
Essl, K. 2002. Generative Music. http://www.essl.at/bibliogr/generative-music.html (accessed 22 Mar 2010).
García, A. et al. 2010. Music Composition Based on Linguistic Approach. 9th Mexican International Conference on Artificial Intelligence, MICAI 2010, Pachuca, Mexico. pp. 117–128.
Intermorphic Limited History of Noatikl, Koan and SSEYO (accessed 26 February 2009).
Lerdahl, F. and R. Jackendoff. 1982. A generative theory of tonal music. Cambridge, Mass: MIT Press.
Lippe, C. 1997. Music for piano and computer: A description. Information Processing Society of Japa SIG Notes, 97 (122): 33-38.
Loy, G. and C. Abbott. 1985. Programming languages for computer music synthesis, performance and composition. ACM Computing Surveys, 17 (2): 235-265.
Nierhaus, G. Algorithmic Composition - Paradigms of Automated Music Generation. Springer 2009.
Rowe, R. 1991. Machine Learning and Composing: Making Sense of Music with Cooperating Real-Time Agents. Thesis from Media Lab. Mass.: MIT.
Winkler, T. 1998. Composing Interactive Music. Cambridge, Massachusetts: MIT Press.
Wooller, R., Brown, A. R, et al. A framework for comparing algorithmic music systems. In: Symposium on Generative Arts Practice (GAP). 2005. University of Technology Sydney.

Computer music software